John Arnold (30 November 1907, Cowley, Oxford – 4 April 1984, Southampton, Hampshire) was an English cricketer and Football player.

Cricket career

John Arnold was an attacking opening batsman for Hampshire for 20 years from 1930, when he qualified by residence, having previously played Minor Counties cricket for Oxfordshire. He scored 1,000 runs in his first full first-class season and missed out on that feat only once in his career. In 1934, he scored 2,261 runs at an average of 48 runs per innings, the only time he passed 2,000 runs in a season. His one poor season, in 1938, led to him not being re-engaged by Hampshire, but the county had second thoughts and he returned for the 1939 season and for five more seasons after the Second World War. He fell ill during the 1950 season, and retired without playing again. He was a first-class umpire for 14 seasons from 1961.

Arnold played only one Test match: with Fred Bakewell, he formed an experimental opening partnership for England against New Zealand at Lord's in 1931, following the retirement from Test cricket of Jack Hobbs and injury to Herbert Sutcliffe. The move was not a success. Arnold was out for 0 in the first innings, and though he scored 34 in the second, he was replaced by the returning Sutcliffe for the second Test. He did not play Test cricket again.

Football career

Arnold also played football for Oxford City, Southampton, and Fulham and won one international cap for England in 1932–33. He is therefore one of only 12 double cricket and football internationals for England. His cap came in the Home International game against Scotland in Glasgow, which Scotland won 2–1. The English scorer was George Hunt of Tottenham Hotspur. Arnold played at outside left.

References

External links
John Arnold at Cricinfo
John Arnold at CricketArchive
Matches and detailed statistics for John Arnold

1907 births
1984 deaths
English cricketers
England Test cricketers
Oxfordshire cricketers
Hampshire cricketers
Players cricketers
English cricket umpires
English footballers
England international footballers
Fulham F.C. players
Oxford City F.C. players
Southampton F.C. players
English Football League players
Association football outside forwards
English cricketers of 1919 to 1945